The Rosa Parks Memorial Building is a 13-story high-rise located in downtown San Bernardino, California. It was built in the 1990s and designed by architect Richard Keating. The building serves as government headquarters for San Bernardino County and California's Inland Empire region.

The building is the second tallest in the city of San Bernardino and fourth tallest in the Inland Empire by height since the new San Bernardino Justice Center building, is  but only has 11 floors; the building has topped out but is expected to be fully completed in fall 2013.

References

Buildings and structures in San Bernardino, California
County government buildings in California
Skyscrapers in California
Skyscraper office buildings in California
Tourist attractions in San Bernardino, California